Rivers is the surname of:

 Austin Rivers (born 1992), American basketball player; son of Doc Rivers
 Bob Rivers (born 1956), American rock-and-roll radio personality and producer and songwriter of parody songs
 Chauncey Rivers (born 1997), American football player
 Clarence Rivers (1931–2004), African-American Catholic priest and composer of liturgical music
 Daniel Rivers (born 1991), British sport shooter
 David Rivers (born 1965), American basketball player
 David Rivers (American football) (born 1994)
 Derek Rivers (born 1994), American football player
 Diana Rivers (born 1931), American writer, artist, and activist
 Glenn Doc Rivers (born 1961), American basketball player and coach
 Francine Rivers (born 1947), American author
 Joan Rivers (1933–2014), American comedian and talk show host
 John Rivers (died 1584), Lord Mayor of London and businessman
 John Rivers (pirate) (died 1719), based in Madagascar
 Johnny Rivers (born 1942), American singer and songwriter
 Keith Rivers (born 1986), American football player
 L. Mendel Rivers (1905–1970), American politician
 Larry Rivers (1923–2002), American artist
 Melissa Rivers (born 1968), American television personality; daughter of Joan Rivers
 Philip Rivers (born 1981), American football player
 Ralph Julian Rivers (1903–1976), American lawyer and politician, first United States Representative from Alaska
 Richard Godfrey Rivers (1858–1925), known as R. Godfrey Rivers, English artist in Australia
 Ron Rivers (born 1971), American football player
 Ronnie Rivers (born 1999), American football player
 Ruben Rivers (1921–1944), Medal of Honor recipient
 Sam Rivers (jazz musician) (1923-2011), American jazz musician
 Sam Rivers (bassist) (born 1977), American bassist 
 Thomas Rivers (nurseryman) (1831–1899), British nurseryman who developed new varieties of roses and fruits
 Tina Rivers Ryan, American curator, art historian
 W. H. R. Rivers (1864–1922), British anthropologist, neurologist and psychiatrist

See also
 Senator Rivers (disambiguation)

English-language surnames
English toponymic surnames